Karsten Kobs (born 16 September 1971 in Dortmund) is a German hammer thrower, whose personal best throw is 82.78 metres, achieved in June 1999 in Dortmund. This ranks him third among German hammer throwers, only behind Ralf Haber and Heinz Weis.

International competitions

References

External links
 
 
 
Leverkusen who's who

1971 births
Living people
Sportspeople from Dortmund
German male hammer throwers
West German male hammer throwers
Olympic athletes of Germany
Athletes (track and field) at the 1996 Summer Olympics
Athletes (track and field) at the 2000 Summer Olympics
Athletes (track and field) at the 2004 Summer Olympics
World Athletics Championships athletes for Germany
World Athletics Championships medalists
European Athletics Championships medalists
World Athletics Championships winners
Competitors at the 1995 Summer Universiade
20th-century German people
21st-century German people